Province of South Carolina, originally known as Clarendon Province, was a province of the Kingdom of Great Britain that existed in North America from 1712 to 1776. It was one of the five Southern colonies and one of the thirteen American colonies. The monarch of Great Britain was represented by the Governor of South Carolina, until the colonies declared independence on July 4, 1776.

Etymology 
"Carolina" is taken from the Latin word for "Charles" (Carolus), honoring King Charles II, and was first named in the 1663 Royal Charter granting to Edward, Earl of Clarendon; George, Duke of Albemarle; William, Lord Craven; John, Lord Berkeley; Anthony, Lord Ashley; Sir George Carteret, Sir William Berkeley, and Sir John Colleton the right to settle lands in the present-day U.S. states of North Carolina, Tennessee, South Carolina, Georgia, Alabama, Mississippi], and Florida.

History 

Charles Town was the first settlement, established in 1670. King Charles II had given the land to a group of eight nobles called the lords proprietor; they planned for a Christian colony. Originally a single proprietary colony, the northern and southern sections grew apart over time, due partly to neglect by the legal heirs of the original lords proprietor. Dissent over the governance of the province led to the appointment of a deputy governor to administer the northern half of the Province of Carolina in 1691. The partition of the province into North and South Carolina became complete in 1712.

The Yamasee War (1715–1717) ravaged the back-country of the province. Complaints that the proprietors had not done enough to protect the provincials against either the Indians or the neighboring Spanish, during Queen Anne's War (1702–1713), convinced many residents of the necessity of ending proprietary rule. A rebellion broke out against the proprietors in 1719. Acting on a petition of residents, King George I appointed the governor of South Carolina in 1720 (the governors of North Carolina would continue to be appointed by the lords proprietor until 1729). After nearly a decade in which the British monarchy sought to locate and buy out the lords, both North and South Carolina became royal colonies in 1729.

Government 

The Court of King's Bench and Common Pleas was founded c.1725, based in Charles Towne. List of Chief Justices:

Demographics

See also 
 Red, White, and Black Make Blue: Indigo in the Fabric of Colonial South Carolina Life

Notes

References

Further reading 

 Coclanis, Peter A., "Global Perspectives on the Early Economic History of South Carolina," South Carolina Historical Magazine, 106 (April–July 2005), 130–46.
Crane, Verner W. The Southern Frontier, 1670-1732 (1956)
 Edgar, Walter. South Carolina: A History, (1998) the standard scholarly history
 Edgar, Walter, ed. The South Carolina Encyclopedia, (University of South Carolina Press, 2006) , the most comprehensive scholarly guide
 Feeser, Andrea. Red, White, and Black Make Blue: Indigo in the Fabric of Colonial South Carolina Life (University of Georgia Press; 2013) 140 pages; scholarly study explains how the plant's popularity as a dye bound together local and transatlantic communities, slave and free, in the 18th century.
Smith, Warren B. White Servitude in Colonial South Carolina (1961)
 Tuten, James H. Lowcountry Time and Tide: The Fall of the South Carolina Rice Kingdom (University of South Carolina Press, 2010) 178 pp. 
Wallace, David Duncan. South Carolina: A Short History, 1520-1948 (1951)  online  standard scholarly history
Wright, Louis B. South Carolina: A Bicentennial History''' (1976) online, popular survey
 Wood, Peter H.  Black Majority: Negroes in Colonial South Carolina from 1670 Through the Stono Rebellion'' (1996)

External links 
 

1712 establishments in the British Empire
1776 disestablishments in the British Empire
Colonial South Carolina
Former provinces
Pre-statehood history of Alabama
Pre-statehood history of Mississippi
States and territories established in 1712
States and territories disestablished in 1776
Thirteen Colonies